Klapzubova jedenáctka  is a 1938 Czechoslovak film. The film starred Josef Kemr.

References

External links
 

1938 films
1930s Czech-language films
Czech association football films
Czechoslovak black-and-white films
Czechoslovak comedy films
1938 comedy films
Czech sports comedy films
1930s sports comedy films
1930s Czech films